Elegy of Ren (hangul: 렌의 애가, Renui aega) is a 1969 South Korean film directed by Kim Ki-young and starring Kim Jin-kyu and Kim Ji-mee.

Plot
The film is a wartime melodrama about an artist and a woman who helps him to paint.

Cast
Kim Jin-kyu as Simon<
Kim Ji-mee as Ren
Kim Myeong-jin
Baek Yeong-min
Park Am
Sa Mi-ja as Simon's wife
Kim Sin-jae
Ji Bang-yeol
Kim Se-ra
Lim Hae-lim

Notes

Bibliography

External links

1960s Korean-language films
South Korean action drama films
Films directed by Kim Ki-young
1960s action drama films